"Good Ol' Bad Days" is a song recorded, co-written, and co-produced by Canadian-American country artist Aaron Goodvin. He wrote the track with Matt Nolen and Skip Black, and co-produced it with Matt McClure. It was the third single off his second studio album V.

Commercial performance
"Good Ol' Bad Days" reached a peak of #9 on the Billboard Canada Country chart dated May 9, 2020, marking Goodvin's fifth career Top 10 hit. It also reached a peak of #98 on the Canadian Hot 100, Goodvin's third charting entry on the all-genre national chart.

Music video
The official music video for "Good Ol' Bad Days" premiered on March 22, 2020. It was directed by Travis Didluck, and shot in Toronto, Ontario.

Charts

References

2019 songs
2020 singles
Aaron Goodvin songs
Warner Music Group singles
Songs written by Aaron Goodvin